Maria Minor church (Sancta Maria Minor kyrka) is a church rediscovered after archaeological surveys in Lund, Sweden.

A post church with palisade walls, also called Sancta Maria, was discovered in 1911 on a site just south of the great square, Stortorget. That church had been built in the mid 11th century, 1060 is postulated through dendrochronological dating, at a time when several stave churches were erected in Lund.

References

External links
 Sancta Maria Minor in Kulturen (also in Swedish)

Archaeological sites in Sweden
Church of Sweden churches
Buildings and structures in Lund